Carsten Niebuhr, or Karsten Niebuhr (17 March 1733 Lüdingworth – 26 April 1815 Meldorf, Dithmarschen), was a German mathematician, cartographer, and explorer in the service of Denmark. He is renowned for his participation in the Royal Danish Arabia Expedition (1761-1767). He was the father of the Danish-German statesman and historian Barthold Georg Niebuhr, who published an account of his father's life in 1817.

Early life and education

Niebuhr was born in Lüdingworth (now a part of Cuxhaven, Lower Saxony) in what was then Bremen-Verden. His father Barthold Niebuhr (1704-1749) was a successful farmer and owned his own property. Carsten and his sister were educated at home by a local school teacher, then he attended the Latin School in Otterndorf, near Cuxhaven.

Originally Niebuhr had intended to become a surveyor, but in 1757 he went to the Georgia Augusta University of Göttingen, at this time Germany's most progressive institution of higher education. Niebuhr was probably a bright student because in 1760 Johann David Michaelis (1717-1791) recommended him as a participant in the Royal Danish Arabia Expedition (1761-1767), mounted by Frederick V of Denmark (1722–1766). For a year and a half before the expedition Niebuhr studied mathematics, cartography and navigational astronomy under Tobias Mayer (1723–1762), one of the premier astronomers of the 18th century, and the author of the Lunar Distance Method for determining longitude. Niebuhr's observations during the Arabia Expedition proved the accuracy and the practicality of this method for use by mariners at sea.

Expeditions
The expedition sailed in January 1761 via Marseilles and Malta to Istanbul and Alexandria. Then the members of the expedition visited Cairo and Sinai, before traversing the Red Sea via Jiddah to Yemen, which was their main destination.

In Mocha, on 25 May 1763, the expedition's philologist, Frederik Christian von Haven, died, and on 11 July 1763, on the way to Sanaʽa, the capital of Yemen, its naturalist Peter Forsskål also died.

In Sanaʽa the remaining members of the expedition had an audience with the Imam of Yemen al-Mahdi Abbas (1719–1775), but suffered from the climate and returned to Mocha. Niebuhr seems to have preserved his own life and restored his health by adopting native dress and eating native food.

From Mocha the expedition continued to Bombay, the expedition's artist Georg Wilhelm Baurenfeind died on the 29th of August and the expedition's servant Lars Berggren on the following day; both were buried at sea. The surgeon Christian C. Kramer (1732–1763) also died, soon after landing in Bombay. Niebuhr was the only surviving member. He stayed in Bombay for fourteen months and then returned home by way of Muscat, Bushire, Shiraz and Persepolis. His copies of the cuneiform inscriptions at Persepolis proved to be a key turning-point in the decipherment of cuneiform, and the birth of Assyriology.

His transcriptions were especially useful to Georg Friedrich Grotefend, who made the first correct decipherments of Old Persian cuneiform:

He also visited the ruins of Babylon (making many important sketches), Baghdad, Mosul and Aleppo. He seems also to have visited the Behistun Inscription in around 1764. After a visit to Cyprus he made a tour through Palestine, crossed the Taurus Mountains to Bursa, reached Constantinople in February 1767 and finally arrived in Copenhagen in the following November.

Niebuhr's production during the expedition is indeed impressive. It includes small-scale maps and charts of Yemen, the Red Sea, the Persian Gulf and Oman, and other larger scale maps covering the Nile Delta, the Gulf of Suez and the regions surrounding various port cities he visited, including Mocha and Surat. He completed 28 town plans of significant historical value because of their uniqueness for that period.

In summary, Niebuhr's maps, charts and plans constitute the greatest single addition to the cartography of the region that was produced through field research and published in the 18th century.

Family and later career
In 1773 Niebuhr married Christiane Sophia Blumenberg, the daughter of the crown physician, and for some years he held a post in the Danish military service, which enabled him to remain in Copenhagen. In 1776 he was elected a foreign member of the Royal Swedish Academy of Sciences. In 1778 he accepted a position in the civil service of Danish Holstein, and went to reside at Meldorf (Ditmarschen). In 1806 he was promoted to Etatsrat, and in 1809 was made a Knight of the Order of the Dannebrog, one of Denmark-Norway's most valued honours for service.

Writing and research
Niebuhr's first book, Beschreibung von Arabien, was published in Copenhagen in 1772, the Danish government providing subsidies for the engraving and printing of its numerous illustrations. This was followed in 1774 and 1778 by the first two volumes of Niebuhr's Reisebeschreibung nach Arabien und andern umliegender Ländern. These works (particularly the one published in 1778), and most specifically the accurate copies of the cuneiform inscriptions found at Persepolis, were to prove to be extremely important to the decipherment of cuneiform writing. Before Niebuhr's publication, cuneiform inscriptions were often thought to be merely decorations and embellishments, and no accurate decipherments or translations had been made up to that point. Niebuhr demonstrated that the three trilingual inscriptions found at Persepolis were in fact three distinct forms of cuneiform writing (which he termed Class I, Class II, and Class III) to be read from left to right. His accurate copies of the trilingual inscriptions gave Orientalists the key to finally crack the cuneiform code, leading to the discovery of Old Persian, Akkadian, and Sumerian.

The third volume of the Reisebeschreibung, also based on materials from the expedition, was not published till 1837, long after Niebuhr's death, under the editorship of his daughter and his assistant, Johan Nicolaus Gloyer. Niebuhr also contributed papers on the interior of Africa, the political and military condition of the Ottoman Empire, and other subjects to a German periodical, the Deutsches Museum. In addition, he edited and published the work of his friend Peter Forsskål, the naturalist on the Arabian expedition, under the titles Descriptiones animalium, Flora Aegyptiaco-Arabica and Icones rerum naturalium (Copenhagen, 1775 and 1776).

French and Dutch translations of Niebuhr's narratives were published during his lifetime, and a condensed English translation of his own three volumes, prepared by Robert Heron, was published in Edinburgh in 1792, under the title "Travels through Arabia". A facsimile edition of this translation, as by "M. Niebuhr", was published in two volumes by the Libraire du Liban, Beirut (undated).

The government funds covered only a fraction of the printing costs for Niebuhr's first book, and probably a similar or smaller proportion of the costs for the other two volumes. To ensure that the volumes were published, Niebuhr had to pay over 80% of the costs himself. In all, Niebuhr devoted ten years of his life, the years 1768-1778, to the publication of six volumes of findings from the expedition. He had virtually no help from the academics who had conceived and shaped the expedition in Göttingen and Copenhagen. It was only Niebuhr's determination to publish the findings of the expedition that ensured that the Danish Arabia Expedition would produce results that would benefit the world of scholarship.

Death and legacy
Niebuhr died in Meldorf in 1815.

Johann Wolfgang von Goethe (1749-1832) highly prized Niebuhr's works. In 1811 he wrote to Niebuhr's son, Barthold Georg Niebuhr, that "You carry a name which I have learned to honour since my youth."

Carsten Niebuhrs Gade, a street in the port area of Copenhagen, is named for him.

In 2011, Copenhagen’s National Library and National Museum held exhibitions of Carsten Niebuhr’s life and work, celebrating the 250th anniversary of the Danish Arabia Expedition’s commencement. Commemorative Carsten Niebuhr postal stamps were issued. And in the same year the Danish Ministry of Foreign Affairs had planned a series of cultural events based on the Expedition and Niebuhr’s work that would take place in Ankara, Cairo, Damascus, Beirut, Tehran, and Yemen. It has been suggested that these efforts were intended in part to repair the reputational damage in the Islamic world caused by the Danish cartoon controversy. Ultimately, the planned events were prevented by the Arab Spring.

Works
Niebuhr, Carsten. Beschreibung von Arabien. Aus eigenen Beobachtungen und im Lande selbst gesammleten Nachrichten. Copenhagen, 1772. 
Niebuhr, Carsten. Reisebeschreibung nach Arabien und andern umliegender Ländern. 2 vols. Copenhagen, 1774-1778.
Niebuhr, Carsten. "Über Längen-Beobachtungen im Orient u.s.w. Aus einem Schreiben des königl. Dänischen geheimer Justiz-Raths Carsten Niebuhr". Monatliche Correspondenz zur Beförderung der Erd- und Himmels-Kunde 4 (1801), pp. 240–253.
Niebuhr, Carsten. Biographische Nachrichten aus Tobias Mayer's Jugendjahren aus einem Schreiben des Königlich Dänischen Justiz-Raths C. Niebuhr, Monatliche Correspondenz zur Beförderung der Erd-und Himmels-Kunde 8 (1803), pp. 45–56, and 9 (1804), pp. 487–491.
Niebuhr, Carsten. Reisebescheibung nach Arabien und andern umliegenden Ländern. Vol. 3. Carsten Niebuhr Reisen durch Syrien und Palästina, nach Cypern, und durch Kleinasien und die Türkei nach Deutschland und Dännemark, edited by J. N.Gloyer and J. Olshausen. Hamburg, 1837.
Niebuhr, Carsten. Rejsebeskrivele fra Arabien og andre omkringliggende Lande, translated by Hans Christian Fink, with an introduction by Michhael Harbsmeier. 2 vols., Copenhagen, 2003.
Niebuhr, Carsten. Beskrivelse af Arabien ud fra egne iagttagelser og i landet selv samlede efterretinger, translated by Hans Christian Fink, with an introduction by Niels Peter Lemche. Copenhagen, 2009.

References

Bibliography
Baack, Lawrence J. A practical skill that was without equal: Carsten Niebuhr and the navigational astronomy of the Arabian Journey, 1761-1767. The Mariner's Mirror, 99.2(2013), pp. 138–152.
Baack, Lawrence J. Undying curiosity. Carsten Niebuhr and the Royal Danish Expedition to Arabia (1761-1767). Stuttgart, 2014.
 
Carsten Niebuhr (1733-1815) und seine Zeit, edited by Josef Wiesehöfer and Stephan Conermann. Stuttgart, 2002.
Early scientific expeditions and local encounters. New perspectives on Carsten Niebuhr and 'The Arabian Journey'. Proceedings of a symposium on the occasion of the 250th anniversary of the Royal Danish Expedition to Arabia Felix, edited by Ib Friis, Michael Harbsmeier and Jørgen Bæk Simonsen. [Copenhagen], 2013.
 Eck, Reimer. Tobias Mayer, Johann David Michaelis, Carsten Niebuhr und die Göttingen Methode der Längenbestimmung.  Mitteilungen Gauss-Gesellschaft e. V. Göttingen, 22 (1986), pp. 73–81.
Hansen, Thorkild. Arabia Felix, translated by James and Kathleen McFarlane. New York, 1963. 
Hopkins, I.W.J. The maps of Carsten Niebuhr: 200 years after, The Cartographic Journal 4(1967), pp. 115–118.
Moscrop, Andrew. The Camel's Neighbour : Travel and Travellers in Yemen. Oxford, 2020.
Niebuhr, Barthold Georg. Carsten Niebuhrs Leben, Kleine historische und philologische Schriften. Bonn, 1828.
Niebuhr, Barthold Georg. Vorträge über alte Geschichte an der Universität zu Bonn gehalten, edited M. Niebuhr. Vol. 1. Berlin, 1847.
Rasmussen, Stig T., ed. Den Arabiske Rejse 1761-1767. En dansk ekspedition set i verdenskabshistorisk perspektiv. Copenhagen, 1990.
Rasmussen, Stig T., ed. Carsten Niebuhr und die Arabische Reise 1761-1767. Ausstellung der Königlichen Bibliothek Kopenhagen in Zusammenbang mit dem Kultusministerium des Landes Schleswig-Holstein. Heide, 1986.
Hansen, Anne Haslund. Niebuhr's museum. Artefacts and souvenirs from the Royal Danish Expedition to Arabia 1761-1767. Copenhagen, 2016.
Vermeulen, Han F., 'Anthropology and the Orient: C. Niebuhr and the Danish- German Arabia Expedition . In: Han F. Vermeulen: Before Boas. the genesis of ethnography and ethnology in the German Enlightenment. Lincoln & London, University of Nebraska Press, 2016. 

External links

Beschreibung von Arabien text and illustrations at the University of GöttingenTravels in Arabia'' from 1892, featuring Carsten Neibuhr
 

1733 births
1815 deaths
People from Cuxhaven (district)
People from the Electorate of Hanover
Danish explorers
Danish cartographers
Danish surveyors
German explorers
German cartographers
18th-century German mathematicians
Explorers of Asia
Explorers of Arabia
Members of the Royal Swedish Academy of Sciences
Yemen researchers
Palestinologists
Researchers of Yemenite Jewry
19th-century German mathematicians